Nick Allgeyer (born February 3, 1996) is an American professional baseball pitcher for the Toronto Blue Jays organization.

Career

Amateur career
Allgeyer attended St. John Vianney High School in Missouri where he played baseball and ice hockey. In 2014, he was named the Metro Catholic co-player of the year. As a hockey player, he led his team in goals as a senior.

Allgeyer played college baseball for the Iowa Hawkeyes. On October 11, 2016, he underwent Tommy John surgery and missed the 2017 season. Iowa's baseball team was chosen to represent the United States at the 2017 Summer Universiade in Taipei. Allgeyer pitched in relief for Iowa en route to a silver medal.

Professional career
Allgeyer was drafted out of Iowa by the Toronto Blue Jays in the 12th round of the 2018 Major League Baseball draft, receiving a signing bonus of $125,000. He was assigned to the Low-A Vancouver Canadians, where he spent the remainder of the season and posted a 2.73 earned run average (ERA) in 15 games. In 2019, Allgeyer played for the High-A Dunedin Blue Jays, pitching to a 3.95 ERA over 23 games and totaling 118 innings. He was named a Florida State League mid-season all-star as well as a MiLB.com organization all star for the 2019 campaign. Allgeyer did not play in a game in 2020 due to the cancellation of the minor league season because of the COVID-19 pandemic.

On May 15, 2021, Allgeyer was selected to the 40-man roster and promoted to the major leagues for the first time. He was optioned down to Triple-A on May 17 without making an appearance. On July 2, Allgeyer was recalled to the active roster and made his major league debut with a perfect ninth inning against the Tampa Bay Rays. Allgeyer was designated for assignment by Toronto on July 18. Allgeyer was sent outright to the Triple-A Buffalo Bisons on July 27.

References

External links

1996 births
Living people
Baseball players from St. Louis
Major League Baseball pitchers
Toronto Blue Jays players
Iowa Hawkeyes baseball players
Vancouver Canadians players
Dunedin Blue Jays players
Buffalo Bisons (minor league) players